Where There's Smoke is the sixth and final studio album by Australian indie rock band The Cruel Sea. The album was released in September 2001 and peaked at number 25 the ARIA Charts.

Reception
Nell Schofield from ABC said "The Cruel Sea began its life as an experimental instrumental surf band but when Tex Perkins joined in 1989, he brought a whole new image to the group, and a grungy, swamp country sound. The bands' new album Where There's Smoke demonstrates a more laid back sound, written, as it was, on the front porch of Perkins' rural retreat near Mullumbimby." Mark Fraser from Red Back Rock called the album "as laid back as it gets." Fraser said "The fact that there was no pressure involved in the making of this album is evident from go to woe, as each lazy journey just peels off ever so effortlessly."

Track listing

Charts

Release history

References

2001 albums
The Cruel Sea (band) albums